Liam James Coltman (born 25 January 1990) is a New Zealand rugby union player who plays as a hooker for  in New Zealand's domestic National Provincial Championship (NPC) and the  in the international Super Rugby competition.

Coltman has also previously captained Otago in the NPC, and has played eight tests for the All Blacks, New Zealand's international rugby team, since his debut in 2016.

Early career

Born and raised in New Plymouth on the west coast of New Zealand's North Island, Coltman was educated at Francis Douglas Memorial College in his hometown, where he played first XV rugby. Coltman's All Black teammate Beauden Barrett was also his teammate in their first XV. During his high school years, he represented his local province,  at under-16 and under-18 level.

After graduating high school, he moved south to Dunedin to attend the University of Otago and while there he began playing for Alhambra Union in Dunedin's Premier club rugby competition as well as turning out for 's under-18, under-19 and academy sides.

Senior career

Aged just 21 in 2011, he began to establish himself as Otago's first choice in the number 2 jersey, playing in all 10 regular season games, including 6 starts as the men from Dunedin finished 3rd in the Championship, just missing out on the play off spots as New Zealand's domestic season was cut short to accommodate the 2011 Rugby World Cup which was taking place in the country.

Coltman played 22 of the Razorbacks' 23 games across the 2 seasons and this included 18 starts.

Coltman played 18 games across the 2 seasons and scored 3 tries.

Super Rugby

A member of the  wider training group in 2011 and 2012, Coltman finally made the full squad ahead of the 2013 Super Rugby season. Serving as back up to experienced All Black, Andrew Hore, he managed an impressive 13 appearances, mainly from the replacements bench, during his first campaign of Super Rugby.

Coltman started for the Highlanders against the touring British & Irish Lions team on 13 June 2017, contributing heavily towards the Highlanders' narrow 23–22 win and scoring a try in the 59th minute. Coltman was replaced by Greg Pleasants-Tate in the 67th minute.

International
Coltman was a member of the New Zealand Under-20 side which won the 2010 IRB Junior World Championship held in Argentina, scoring 1 try in 5 matches.

He was called up to the All Blacks squad to provide injury cover for Nathan Harris during the 2016 Rugby Championship, but didn't get any game time during the tournament as Dane Coles and Codie Taylor remained fit and in good form.   However, during the 2016 end-of-year rugby union internationals, he made his debut, coming on as a 65th minute replacement for Codie Taylor in a 68–10 victory against  in Rome.

Coltman failed to make the field for the All Blacks during 2017, due to injury, but was re-selected for the three-test 2018 Steinlager series against France after an outstanding Super Rugby season. Coltman replaced Codie Taylor in the 71st minute of the series' final test, on 23 June 2018. Coltman did not make a mistake as the All Blacks beat France 49–14, winning the series 3–0.

After a series of excellent performances throughout the 2019 Super Rugby season, Coltman overtook Nathan Harris as New Zealand's third-choice hooker. He made two appearances off the bench during the 2019 Rugby Championship, with Dane Coles still struggling with injuries.

On 28 August 2019, All Blacks Head Coach, Steve Hansen, named Coltman in New Zealand's 31-man squad for the 2019 Rugby World Cup. Coltman made his first-ever start for New Zealand during the pool stages, in a 63–0 win over Canada. Although Coltman didn't play in any other tests during the pool stages, he replaced Dane Coles off the bench during the 24th minute of the Bronze Final. Coltman was one of the star performers of the match, with New Zealand beating Wales 40–17 in the bronze final, claiming third place at the World Cup.

Career honours

University of Otago Hardmen

New Zealand Under-20

IRB Junior World Championship – 2010

Highlanders

Super Rugby – 2015

Super Rugby statistics

References

Living people
1990 births
Rugby union hookers
Rugby union players from New Plymouth
Otago rugby union players
Highlanders (rugby union) players
New Zealand rugby union players
New Zealand international rugby union players
People educated at Francis Douglas Memorial College
University of Otago alumni
Lyon OU players